Lycée Évariste Galois is a senior high school/sixth-form college in Sartrouville, Yvelines, France, in the Paris metropolitan area.

References

External links
 Lycée Évariste Galois 

Lycées in Yvelines
Sartrouville